Ottó Binder (14 May 1889 – 27 November 1951) was a Hungarian equestrian. He competed in two events at the 1928 Summer Olympics.

References

1889 births
1951 deaths
Hungarian male equestrians
Olympic equestrians of Hungary
Equestrians at the 1928 Summer Olympics
People from Mediaș